Boylestone is a village in Derbyshire, England.

External links

Villages in Derbyshire
Derbyshire Dales